Petra Kvitová was the defending champion, but lost in the second round to Carla Suárez Navarro.

Venus Williams won the title, defeating Alizé Cornet 6–3, 6–0.
This was Williams' 45th overall WTA title. She also extended her winning streak at Dubai Tennis Championships to 15 matches, having previously won in 2009 and 2010.

Seeds
The top four seeds receive a bye into the second round.

Draw

Finals

Top half

Bottom half

Qualifying

Seeds

Qualifiers

Draw

First qualifier

Second qualifier

Third qualifier

Fourth qualifier

External links
 WTA tournament draws

2014 WTA Tour
2014 Women's Singles